The canton of Écouves (before March 2020: canton of Radon) is an administrative division of the Orne department, northwestern France. It was created at the French canton reorganisation which came into effect in March 2015. Its seat is in Écouves.

It consists of the following communes:
 
Aunay-les-Bois
Barville
Brullemail
Buré
Bures
Bursard
Le Chalange
Coulonges-sur-Sarthe
Courtomer
Écouves
Essay
Ferrières-la-Verrerie
Gâprée
Hauterive
Laleu
Larré
Marchemaisons
Le Mêle-sur-Sarthe
Le Ménil-Broût
Ménil-Erreux
Le Ménil-Guyon
Montchevrel
Neuilly-le-Bisson
Le Plantis
Saint-Agnan-sur-Sarthe
Saint-Aubin-d'Appenai
Sainte-Scolasse-sur-Sarthe
Saint-Germain-le-Vieux
Saint-Julien-sur-Sarthe
Saint-Léger-sur-Sarthe
Saint-Léonard-des-Parcs
Saint-Quentin-de-Blavou
Semallé
Tellières-le-Plessis
Trémont
Les Ventes-de-Bourse
Vidai

References

Cantons of Orne